The Ministry of Hotels and Tourism is a ministry in the Burmese government responsible for the country's tourism sector.

Departments
The Ministry of Hotels and Tourism is divided into the following departments.

Union Minister's  Office 
 Administration and Human Resources Management
 Taking care of administrative works of the offices of the Ministry and Permanent Secretary.
 Taking care of staff administration and general administration of the Ministry’s office.
 Making necessary arrangement for selecting participants to attend trainings in Myanmar and abroad and sending them and providing trainings conducted by the Ministry’s arrangement.
 Supervising the activities for sending Ministry’s delegates to conferences, exhibitions and seminars held in Myanmar and abroad.
 Carrying out the functions relating to business registration, licensing and tax to be managed by the Ministry.
 Duties and Responsibilities of the Policy Department
 Reviewing on orders and directives Myanmar Hotel and Tourism Law.
 Submitting to supplement the facts of Myanmar Hotel and Tourism Law with necessity.
 Reviewing, observing and performing on orders and directives.
 Acting the legal advice of the Union Attorney General office to promulgate the required laws, rules and regulations and procedures which it is to become the accomplishment of tourism industry in the nation.
 Answering the related questions and proposal, who asked from the parliamentarians.
 Submitting the proposal letter to the Union Government’s Meeting and the respective committee of the Union Government.
 Promulgating the necessary policies, order, directives and notifications to perform the current tourism industry in accordance with the modernize system.
 Amending and reviewing the requirement of order concern with business license.
 According to the current situation and tourism industry, Myanmar Hotel and Tourism Lawis necessary to enact new Myanmar Tourism Business Law (Draft) that shall be in line with other international tourism laws.
 The Ministry of Hotels and Tourism prescribed the following notifications such as "the beaches as the tourist destinations with notification No. (1 /2015)"and "sustainable for coastal beach areas with notification No.(2/2015)"according to the Myanmar Hotel and Tourism Law section 31,sub-section(b)on 1 January 2015.
 Planning and Statistics Department’s Responsibilities
 Reporting the progress and planning to short term, long term and yearly plan.
 Negotiating and implementing the projects of Ministry and States & Regions.
 On behalf of the Ministry, reporting to other Ministries by collecting the statistics data.
 Emphasizing to be correct in collecting the statistics data.
 Collecting and storing the documents and data by using computerized technology.
 Continuously monitoring in collecting and distributing these data by networking with States and Regions.
 Implementing the e-government and information technology system.
 Assessing and analyzing the research.
 Maintaining the performance record of organizations that are supervised by MOHT by utilizing the ICT.
 Internal Audit and Finance Department
 Calculate the estimate budget and receiving and reimbursing in accord with the procedures.
 Collecting budget data from departments in monthly basis.
 Mentoring the budget allocation and expending of the departments in line with Government’s functions.
 Scrutinize the process to be in line with procedures.
 Performing internal audit within Ministry.
 Coordination with Union Auditor General’s Office for auditing and taking solutions of the audit objections.
 Public Relation & Information Department
 Providing travel information for domestic and international media.
 Uploading the activities of the Ministry of Hotels and Tourism and sharing information related to tourism on the Website and Social Media.
 Technically assisting for video conferencing meeting with line ministries and Regions & State Governments as part of e-Government activities.
 Documentary video recording for meetings with international organizations, ceremonies and activities of the Ministry of Hotels & Tourism related to tourism.
 Applying permission for special interest tours entering Myanmar through the borders such as caravan tours, motor cycle tours, cycling tours, yacht tours, cruise tours, river-cruise tours and charter flight tours to the Union Government and giving approval letter to tour companies and assigning liaison officers for that tours.
 Providing travel news to MRTV and uploading news on ministry website and Facebook.
 Executive Office Duties and Responsibilities
 Administrating of local and foreign itinerary activities of Union Minister and Senior Officials
 Managing procedure of Union Minister and Senior Officials’ itinerary part of the speeches and related to the other Ministries.
 Union Minister and Senior Officials’ housing labours and divers of salaries and expenses arranging
 Registration of Union Minister, Deputy Minister’s, Permanent Secretary and Deputy Permanent Secretary in and out letters, reply and contact.
 Occasionally carrying out the duties and responsibilities.

Directorate of Hotels and Tourism 
 Hotels and Tourism Supervising Department
 Issuing and Supervising Hotels, Motels and Lodging-house business licences.
 Issuing and Supervising the tour operation enterprise licences.
 Issuing and Supervising the tourist transport business licences.
 Issuing and Supervising the tour guide business licences.
 Extension of all business licences and Cancellation of licences which are not conformity with current condition.
 Reviewing and Supervision on exciting hotels and tourism Law, Rules, Orders and directives.
 Inspection and Supervision the Business License that these have been issued by Ministry of Hotels and Tourism.
 Inspection and Instructing the hotels and tourism’s statistics data.
 Taking Inspection and Supervision the branch offices of Directorate of hotels and tourism’s responsibilities and duties of issue the four business licences.
 Cooperation and Supporting the human Resources development training for the hotels & tourism industry and promotion the hotels & tourism sectors.
 Training and Education Department
 Selecting candidates for meetings, workshops, seminars and other occasions held by ministries and organizations.
 Supervising the hotel and training schools for private sector.
 Collaborating with institutions from abroad to open capacity building training in Myanmar.
 Registering and keeping record of the trainings and participants.
 Organizing the regional training courses for hotel and tourism.
 Managing the library of Ministry of Hotels and Tourism.
 Managing the tourism training and education department.
 Performing assigned tasks occasionally.
 The Functions of Planning Department
 Disseminating the information about the procedures relating to the proposals of hotel project to Local and Foreign Entrepreneurs.
 Scrutinizing the proposals of hotel project submitted by Local and Foreign Entrepreneurs.
 Developing hotel zone and coordinating with the office of Ministry of Hotels and Tourism and relevant Regional Authorities for developing hotel zone.
 Developing new hotel projects, making feasibility study and planning for implementation.
 Scrutinizing local and foreign hotel projects in accordance with the legal laws, procedures and directives.
 Supervising the implementation of local and foreign projects.
 Monitoring continuously the implementation of hotel projects in order to conform with the terms and conditions contained in the contracts.
 Revealing matters relating to the breach of contract so as to take legal action.
 Coordinating with the relevant departments for the matters relating to the imported hotel equipments, materials, taxation and other matters.
 Scrutinizing the construction designs of the projects.
 Drafting the Agreements.
 International & Regional Cooperation Department cooperates with the following organizations:
 Tourism Cooperation under the frameworks of ASEAN, Greater Mekong Sub-region-GMS, Cambodia-Laos-Myanmar-Viet Nam-CLMV, Ayeyawady- Chao Phraya- Mekong Economic Cooperation Strategy-ACMECS, Bay of Bengal Initiative for Multi-sectoral Technical and Economic Cooperation-BIMSTEC.
 Collecting budget data from departments in monthly basis.
 Bilateral Cooperation with International and Regional Countries.
 Duties and Responsibilities of Tourism Promotion Department
 Enhancing the awareness of Tourist Destinations and describing the attractive tourist destinations and tourism activities for the development of Tourism Industry in Myanmar.
 Showcasing tourism promotional materials such as Brochures, Pamphlets and CD, DVD in International Travel Shows and sending them to Myanmar Embassies in abroad.
 Publication for Pamphlets, Brochures about the Potential Tourist Destinations.
 Organizing the necessary arrangements for the participants to attend the International Travel Shows, Workshops, Forums and Seminars related to the tourism.
 Contacting not only with the neighboring countries but also the other potential countries for the marketing and promotion.
 Implementing the activities and Events related to the tourism promotion and marketing in accordance with the guidance of Union Minister occasionally.
 Coordination and cooperation to be held on tourism promotional events and festivals in domestic areas.
 Executive Office Duties and Responsibilities
 Administrating of local and foreign itinerary activities of Union Minister and Senior Officials
 Managing procedure of Union Minister and Senior Officials’ itinerary part of the speeches and related to the other Ministries.
 Union Minister and Senior Officials’ housing labours and divers of salaries and expenses arranging
 Registration of Union Minister, Deputy Minister’s, Permanent Secretary and Deputy Permanent Secretary in and out letters, reply and contact.
 Occasionally carrying out the duties and responsibilities.

References

External links
 

1992 establishments in Myanmar
Hotels And Tourism
Ministries established in 1992
Tourism in Myanmar
Myanmar